TİSAŞ (Trabzon Silah Sanayi AŞ) is a Turkish firearm manufacturing company, mainly focused on manufacturing pistols. Its firearms are used worldwide by civilians, police and military.

History

TISAS was established in Trabzon in 1993. TİSAŞ is a KOSGEB (Small and Medium Industry Development Organization) and M.K.E (Mechanical and Chemical Industry Corporation) coordinated company. TİSAŞ foundation is settled on an open area of 11,000 m² in Arsin Trabzon Organized Industry Zone and total covered area of the facilities is 5,500 m². TİSAŞ founded its Ankara District Office in 1998 to meet increasing demand and to execute foreign trade operations.

TİSAŞ began to produce its first pistol, the 7.65 mm Fatih 13, in 1994. In 1998, TİSAŞ decided to manufacture 9×19 mm pistols as well, with a view to meet market demand. Joint studies were carried out within the scope of the Eastern Black Sea Weapon Project by the R & D Department at TİSAŞ and the Black Sea Technical University KOSGEB Technology Development Department. As a result, TİSAŞ began to produce 9×19 mm KANUNİ 16 pistols with a capacity of 15 as of 1999. In 2000, TİSAŞ began to manufacture the KANUNİ S and ZİGANA M16 series of Turkish-patented pistols. In 2003, ZİGANA K and ZİGANA T models have been added to the TİSAŞ pistol models. In 2004, USA Firearms Technology Branch examined the models ZİGANA M16, ZİGANA K, ZİGANA T and found each one to have the characteristics in conformity with the ATF Form 4590, "Factoring Criteria for Weapons". At the end of the year 2005, a new model ZİGANA SPORT was offered for sale. In 2006, TİSAŞ has completed the R&D and the tests for the first .45 caliber gun of Turkey, ZİGANA C45 and introduce to the market at the beginning of 2007. Within the same year, 9×19 mm ZİGANA F and new version FATİH 13 .380 ACP models were offered to sale.

Product Line

Pistols

 ZİG M 1911 
 ZİGANA F  
ZİGANA FC  
 ZİGANA C45 
ZİGANA KC 
 ZİGANASPORT 
 ZİGANA T  
 ZİGANA K 

 ZİGANA KC
 ZİGANA FC
 ZİGANA M16
 ZİGANA P06
ZİGANA P9L
ZİGANA P9LC
ZİGANA 63
ZİG M9

 ZİG P17  
ZİG PX  
ZİG M1  
ZİG 14  
 KANUNİ S  
 KANUNİ 16  
 FATİH 13  
 FATİH 13 .380 ACP
 REGENT RP9

Source:

Infantry rifles 
 ZPT 5.56×45mm NATO and 7.62×51mm NATO variants
 ZPT 556L
 ZPT 556K
 ZPT 556U
 ZPT 762

Notes

External links
 TISAŞ
 Zigana pistols at Modern Firearms

Turkish companies established in 1993
Manufacturing companies established in 1993
Firearm manufacturers of Turkey